Joseph François Salomon (April 1649 – 5 March 1732) was a French composer of the Baroque era. Born in Toulon, he learnt to play the bass viol and the harpsichord, and went to Paris to work as a musician for the royal family. He was 52 when he composed his first opera, the tragédie en musique Médée et Jason.

Operas
Médée et Jason (1713)
Théonoé (1715)

Sources
Le magazine de l'opéra baroque by Jean-Claude Brenac (in French)

External links
 

1649 births
1732 deaths
Musicians from Toulon
French Baroque composers
French classical composers
French male classical composers
French opera composers
Male opera composers
18th-century classical composers
18th-century French composers
18th-century French male musicians
17th-century male musicians